The Wyoming Cowboys football program represents the University of Wyoming in college football. They compete in the Mountain West Conference of the Football Bowl Subdivision (FBS) of NCAA Division I and have won 14 conference titles. The head coach is Craig Bohl, who entered his first season in 2014.

The Cowboy football program has been among the most notable of "stepping stone" programs due to the success of its former coaches. Coaches such as Bowden Wyatt, Bob Devaney, Fred Akers, Pat Dye, Dennis Erickson and Joe Tiller were at Wyoming immediately prior to gaining notoriety at bigger football powerhouses.

History

Black 14
In 1969, 14 black team members wore black armbands to a practice, intending to protest the racism they had been victims of at their last game with an upcoming opponent, BYU. head coach Lloyd Eaton threw them off the team, "triggering an uproar that consumed the rest of the football season and much of everything else in the tiny college town of Laramie, Wyoming."

In 2018, filmmaker Darius Monroe released a documentary short about the athletes: Black 14. The short "uses only archival footage to tell the story, mostly from local ABC and NBC affiliates in Wyoming, letting the principals – from the students, to the coach, to the school president and even the state’s governor – speak for themselves."

Conference affiliations
 Independent (1893–1904)
 Colorado Football Association (1905–1908)
 Rocky Mountain Athletic Conference (1909–1937)
 Mountain States Conference (1938–1961)
 Western Athletic Conference (1962–1998)
 Mountain West Conference (1999–present)

Championships

Conference championships
Wyoming has won 14 conference championships, ten outright and four shared.

† Co-champion

Division championships
Wyoming won the Western Athletic Conference's Pacific division championship in 1996 and lost in the league's championship game. Wyoming shared the Mountain West's Mountain division championship in 2016 and lost in the league's championship game.

† Co-champion

Head coaches

Bowl games

The Cowboys have appeared in 17 bowl games and have a record of nine wins and eight losses (9–8). Their most recent bowl appearance came in their 52–38 win over Kent State in the 2021 Famous Idaho Potato Bowl.

Stadiums

War Memorial Stadium was built in 1950 with an original capacity of 20,000 fans; the current capacity is 29,181 after the completion of 2009-2010 stadium upgrades.

The playing surface was natural grass until 2005, when infilled artificial turf was installed.

Prior to War Memorial Stadium, the Cowboys played at Corbett Field, a small field located southeast of Half Acre Gym where the Business Building and the Student Union parking lot now sit. It was named for John J. Corbett, longtime all-sport coach and director of physical education at the school. The field was the first official stadium for the Cowboys; previously they had played on Prexy's Pasture, the main green of the school.

Rivalries

Colorado State

The Bronze Boot is awarded to the winner of the college football game between Wyoming and Colorado State Rams in nearby Fort Collins, Colorado. The annual game has evolved into one of the most bitterly contested rivalries in college football. The teams have waged the "Border War" over 100 times since the schools began playing in 1899, playing every year except 1901, 1902, 1906, 1907, 1918, 1924, 1926, 1927, 1928, 1943, 1944, and 1945. This is one of the oldest interstate rivalries west of the Mississippi River. The series is the oldest rivalry for both schools and the "Border War" has been played in three different centuries. CSU leads the series 59-50-5.

Hawaii

The Paniolo Trophy is awarded to the winner of the college football games played between Wyoming and Hawaii Rainbow Warriors football Hawaii. This rivalry started in 1979 when Hawaii joined the Western Athletic Conference WAC conference and was played annually until 1997, shortly before Wyoming joined the newly formed Mountain West Conference. Hawaii joined the MWC as a football–only affiliate member in 2012, renewing the rivalry. Wyoming leads the series 16–11.

Utah State

Bridger's Battle is the name for the games played between Wyoming and Utah State, the winner of which is awarded the trophy of the rivalry, a .50 caliber Rocky Mountain Hawken rifle. The rivalry started in 1903, and renewed as an annual game in 2013 when Utah State joined the Mountain West Conference. USU leads the series 40-28-4.

Air Force

Air Force and Wyoming have played each other every year in the Front Range rivalry since 1980 and met an additional 18 times before that, for a total of 60 contests. Their proximity has led them to be division rivals in multiple conferences. Two-time WAC Defensive Player of the Year Mitch Donahue once said “I hated them more than CSU. They were good, fast and little. They would bite at your heels all the time.” In 1998, #23 Air Force defeated number #25 Wyoming to win the WAC championship 10–7. In 2012 after Air Force defeated Wyoming, former Wyoming coach Dave Christensen went on a profanity-laced tirade about Air Force coach Troy Calhoun that drew national attention and a $50,000 fine for Christensen. As of 2022, the 2012 game is the last time that Air Force has won a game in Laramie. The teams did not meet in the COVID-19 season, and UW won the 2022 meeting 17–14. This is a closely fought contest, with the Air Force Academy leading the all-time series 30-27-3.

Notable players

Mike Dirks (born 1946), defensive tackle; part of one of college football's best defenses in 1966 and 1967. He was selected as an All-American and All-Western Athletic Conference performer. He co-captained Wyoming's 1967 WAC Championship football team that finished fifth in the nation. Led the Cowboys to a 10–1 record and berth in the 1968 Sugar Bowl. He was part of the Cowboys line that was the nation's best rushing defense for two consecutive seasons. No team in the nation has since allowed fewer rushing yards than the 1966 and 1967 Wyoming defenses. Dirks produced 71 tackles, 30 unassisted tackles, and 26 tackles for a loss. He was inducted into the Wyoming Cowboys Athletic Hall of Fame on October 29, 1993.
Adam Goldberg (born 1980), NFL offensive tackle. He became only the third junior in University of Wyoming football history to be elected a team captain when he was voted a captain by his teammates in the spring of 2001. He was Honorable Mention All-America and two-time First-team All-Mountain West Conference. He started 44 of 45 career games.
Jerry Hill (born 1939) - running back - was selected as Wyoming's Football Player of the Century during fan balloting in 1992. He was selected as an All-Skyline Conference running back in 1959 and 1960. In those two seasons, Hill was Wyoming's leading rusher. During his career, the Cowboys posted a 25–6 record. Hill was a member of the club that won the 1958 Sun Bowl. His career would finish with 1,374 rushing yards on 288 carries. He was inducted in the Wyoming Cowboys Athletic Hall of Fame on October 29, 1993.
Jim Kiick (1946-2020) - running back - Wyoming's leading rusher for each of his three seasons, 1965-67. He totalled 1,714 yards and ten touchdowns on 431 carries, and 561 yards and five touchdowns on 52 pass receptions. He was the first player ever to earn first-team All-Western Athletic Conference honors three times. Kiick was co-captain of the team as a senior. He was named the Most Valuable Player in the 1966 Sun Bowl victory over Florida State, rushing 25 times for 135 yards and two touchdowns, and catching four passes for 42 yards. He also played in the 1968 Sugar Bowl against LSU, rushing 19 times for 75 yards and a touchdown, and catching five passes for 48 yards. Kiick played in the 1968 Senior Bowl, and was selected to play in the 1968 College All-Star Game.
Marv Levy (born 1925) - defensive back - Levy attended Wyoming for a single semester following his stint as a meteorologist in World War II. The coach who had originally recruited him, Bunny Oakes, had left prior to the season; Bowden Wyatt, who succeeded Oakes, imposed a round-the-clock training regimen that did not allow Levy enough time to devote to his academic studies. Levy transferred to Coe College and established a long coaching career that led to a Grey Cup win with the Montreal Alouettes and four consecutive AFC Championships with the Buffalo Bills; these achievements earned Levy induction into the Canadian Football Hall of Fame and Pro Football Hall of Fame, respectively.
Jay Novacek (born 1962) - tight end - was a two sport All-American at Wyoming, also excelling in track. He was the Wyoming record holder in the decathlon and pole vault. As a football player, he was selected to the Kodak All-American football team in 1984. The selection was attributed to setting an NCAA record for receiving yards per receptions by a tight end. Novacek finished his Cowboys career with 83 career receptions for 1,536 yards and 10 touchdowns as a tight end. He was inducted in the Wyoming Cowboys Athletic Hall of Fame on October 29, 1993. He was also inducted to the College Football Hall of Fame on July 19, 2009.
Josh Allen (born 1996) - quarterback - a late recruit in 2015, Allen led the team to its first appearance in the Mountain-West Conference championship game in 2016 and two bowl games, receiving All-Mountain West honors. He finished his Wyoming career with 5,066 passing yards, 44 passing touchdowns, and 56 overall touchdowns, which rank in the top five for Wyoming Cowboys passing statistics. He was drafted by the Buffalo Bills in 2018, becoming the highest drafted player in Wyoming Cowboys history.

Honors and awards
Mike Dirks, First Team All-Western Athletic Conference, 1967
Mike Dirks, Football writers of America, Look Magazine, Newspaper Enterprise Association All-American, 1967
Mike Dirks, Team Co-Captain on NCAA record setting defense
Marcus Harris, Fred Biletnikoff Award, given annually to the most outstanding receiver in college football by the Tallahassee Quarterback Club Foundation, 1996 
Marcus Harris, Paul Warfield Trophy, Award given to the nation's top collegiate wide receiver by the Touchdown Club of Columbus, 1996
Marcus Harris, inducted into the Wyoming Athletics Hall of Fame on September 24, 2004.
Jerry Hill, First Team All-Skyline Conference, 1959, 1960
Jerry Hill, Selected Wyoming Football Player of the Century, 1992
Jerry Hill, Honorable Mention All-American, 1959, 1960
Jerry Hill, Admiral Emory S. Land Award Winner
Jim Kiick, Tailback, Most Valuable Player, 1966 Sun Bowl
Leonard Kucewski, Guard, Most Valuable Player, 1958 Sun Bowl
Jay Novacek, First Team All-Western Athletic Conference & Football All-American, 1984

All-Americans

 C.T. Hewgley, Tackle- 1950 (APO-2nd)
 Eddie Talboom, HB-1950  (APO-2nd; INSO-1st; CP-3rd) (College Football Hall of Fame)
 Dewey McConnell, DE- 1952 (APD-1st; NEAD-1st)
 Mike Dirks, DT- 1967 (FWAA-1st; NEA-1st)
 Jerry DePoyster, K- 1967 (AP-1st; FN-1st; TSN-1st)
 Bob Jacobs, K- 1969 (FWAA-1st; TSN-1st)
 Larry Nels, DT- 1969 (CP-3rd
 Marcus Harris, WR- 1995 (1st)
 Marcus Harris, WR- 1996 (1st)

Future non-conference opponents
Announced schedules as of December 12, 2022.

References

External links

 

 
American football teams established in 1892
1892 establishments in Wyoming